Joseph Haydn's String Quartets, Op. 64, is a set of six string quartets composed in 1790. Along with six earlier quartets published under the opus numbers 54 and 55, they are known as the Tost quartets, after the Hungarian violinist and later merchant Johann Tost who helped Haydn find a publisher for the works. Unlike the earlier quartets, Haydn actually dedicated the Op. 64 set to Tost in gratitude for his efforts.

List of Opus 64 quartets 
Quartet No. 48 in C major, Op. 64, No. 1, FHE No. 31, Hoboken No. III:65 
 Allegro moderato  
 Menuetto: Allegretto ma non troppo  
 Allegretto scherzando  
 Finale: Presto  
Quartet No. 49 in B minor, Op. 64, No. 2, FHE No. 32, Hoboken No. III:68 
 Allegro spiritoso  
 Adagio ma non troppo  
 Menuetto: Allegretto  
 Finale: Presto  
Quartet No. 50 in B major, Op. 64, No. 3, FHE No. 33, Hoboken No. III:67 
 Vivace assai  
 Adagio  
 Menuetto: Allegretto  
 Finale: Allegro con spirito  
Quartet No. 51 in G major, Op. 64, No. 4, FHE No. 34, Hoboken No. III:66 
 Allegro con brio  
 Menuetto: Allegretto  
 Adagio: Cantabile e sostenuto  
 Finale: Presto  
Quartet No. 53 in D major ("The Lark"), Op. 64, No. 5, FHE No. 35, Hoboken No. III:63
 Allegro moderato  
 Adagio cantabile  
 Menuetto: Allegretto  
 Finale: Vivace  
Quartet No. 52 in E major, Op. 64, No. 6, FHE No. 36, Hoboken No. III:64 
 Allegretto  
 Andante  
 Menuetto: Allegretto  
 Finale: Presto

References
Notes

References

Sources

Further reading

External links

64
1790 compositions
Music dedicated to benefactors or patrons